The Rockefeller Foundation is an American private foundation and philanthropic medical research and arts funding organization based at 420 Fifth Avenue, New York City. The second-oldest major philanthropic institution in America, after the Carnegie Corporation, the foundation was ranked as the 39th largest U.S. foundation by total giving as of 2015. By the end of 2016, assets were tallied at $4.1 billion (unchanged from 2015), with annual grants of $173 million.  According to the OECD, the foundation provided US$103.8 million for development in 2019. The foundation has given more than $14 billion in current dollars.

The foundation was started by Standard Oil magnate John D. Rockefeller ("Senior") and son "Junior", and their primary business advisor, Frederick Taylor Gates, on May 14, 1913, when its charter was granted by New York.

The foundation has had an international reach since the 1930s and major influence on global non-governmental organizations. The World Health Organization is modeled on the International Health Division of the foundation, which sent doctors abroad to study and treat human subjects. The National Science Foundation and National Institute of Health are also modeled on the work funded by Rockefeller. It has also been a supporter of and influence on the United Nations.

In 2020 the foundation pledged that it would divest from fossil fuel, notable since the endowment was largely funded by Standard Oil.

The foundation also has a controversial past, including support of eugenics in the 1930s, as well as several scandals arising from their international field work. In 2021 the foundation's president committed to reckoning with their history, and to centering equity and inclusion.

History

John D. Rockefeller Sr. first conceived the idea of the foundation in 1901. In 1906, Rockefeller's business and philanthropic advisor, Frederick Taylor Gates, encouraged him toward "permanent corporate philanthropies for the good of Mankind" so that his heirs should not "dissipate their inheritances or become intoxicated with power." In 1909 Rockefeller signed over 73,000 shares of his Standard Oil company worth $50 million, to his son, Gates and Harold Fowler McCormick as the third inaugural trustee, in the first installment of a projected $100 million endowment.

The nascent foundation applied for a federal charter in the US Senate in 1910, with at one stage Junior even secretly meeting with President William Howard Taft, through the aegis of Senator Nelson Aldrich, to hammer out concessions. However, because of the ongoing (1911) antitrust suit against Standard Oil at the time, along with deep suspicion in some quarters of undue Rockefeller influence on the spending of the endowment, the result was that Senior and Gates withdrew the bill from Congress in order to seek a state charter from New York.

On May 14, 1913, New York Governor William Sulzer approved a charter for the foundation with Junior becoming the first president. With its large-scale endowment, a large part of Senior's fortune was insulated from inheritance taxes. The first secretary of the foundation was Jerome Davis Greene, the former secretary of Harvard University, who wrote a "memorandum on principles and policies" for an early meeting of the trustees that established a rough framework for the foundation's work. It was initially located within the family office at Standard Oil's headquarters at 26 Broadway, later (in 1933) shifting to the GE Building (then RCA), along with the newly named family office, Room 5600, at Rockefeller Center; later it moved to the Time-Life Building in the center, before shifting to its current Fifth Avenue address.

In 1914, the trustees set up a new Department of Industrial Relations, inviting William Lyon Mackenzie King to head it. He became a close and key advisor to Junior through the Ludlow Massacre, turning around his attitude to unions; however the foundation's involvement in IR was criticized for advancing the family's business interests. The foundation henceforth confined itself to funding responsible organizations involved in this and other controversial fields, which were beyond the control of the foundation itself.

Junior became the foundation chairman in 1917.  Through the Laura Spelman Rockefeller Memorial (LSRM), established by Senior in 1918 and named after his wife, the Rockefeller fortune was for the first time directed to supporting research by social scientists. During its first few years of work, the LSRM awarded funds primarily to social workers, with its funding decisions guided primarily by Junior. In 1922, Beardsley Ruml was hired to direct the LSRM, and he most decisively shifted the focus of Rockefeller philanthropy into the social sciences, stimulating the founding of university research centers, and creating the Social Science Research Council. In January 1929, LSRM funds were folded into the Rockefeller Foundation, in a major reorganization.

The Rockefeller family helped lead the foundation in its early years, but later limited itself to one or two representatives, to maintain the foundation's independence and avoid charges of undue family influence. These representatives have included the former president John D. Rockefeller III, and then his son John D. Rockefeller, IV, who gave up the trusteeship in 1981. In 1989, David Rockefeller's daughter, Peggy Dulany, was appointed to the board for a five-year term. In October 2006, David Rockefeller Jr. joined the board of trustees, re-establishing the direct family link and becoming the sixth family member to serve on the board.

C. Douglas Dillon, the United States Secretary of the Treasury under both Presidents John F. Kennedy and Lyndon B. Johnson, served as chairman of the foundation.

Stock in the family's oil companies had been a major part of the foundation's assets, beginning with Standard Oil and later with its corporate descendants, including Exxon Mobil. In December 2020, the foundation pledged to dump their fossil fuel holdings. With a $5 billion endowment, the Rockefeller Foundation was "the largest US foundation to embrace the rapidly growing divestment movement."  CNN writer Matt Egan noted, "This divestment is especially symbolic because the Rockefeller Foundation was founded by oil money."

Public health

Public health, health aid, and medical research are the most prominent areas of work of the foundation. On December 5, 1913, the Board made its first grant of $100,000 to the American Red Cross to purchase property for its headquarters in Washington, D.C.

The foundation established the Johns Hopkins School of Public Health and Harvard School of Public Health, two of the first such institutions in the United States, and established the School of Hygiene at the University of Toronto in 1927, and the London School of Hygiene and Tropical Medicine in the United Kingdom;. they spent more than $25 million in developing other public health schools in the US and in 21 foreign countries. In 1913, it also began a 20-year support program of the Bureau of Social Hygiene, whose mission was research and education on birth control, maternal health and sex education. In 1914, the foundation set up the China Medical Board, which established the first public health university in China, the Peking Union Medical College, in 1921; this was subsequently nationalized when the Communists took over the country in 1949. In the same year it began a program of international fellowships to train scholars at many of the world's universities at the post-doctoral level. The Foundation also maintained a close relationship with Rockefeller University (also known as the Rockefeller Institute for Medical Research) with many faculty holding overlapping positions between the institutions.

The Sanitary Commission for the Eradication of Hookworm Disease was a Rockefeller-funded campaign from 1909 to 1914 to study and treat hookworm disease in 11 Southern states. Hookworm was known as the "germ of laziness." In 1913, the foundation expanded its work with the Sanitary Commission abroad and set up the International Health Division  (also known as International Health Board), which began the foundation's first international public health activities. The International Health Division conducted campaigns in public health and sanitation against malaria, yellow fever, and hookworm in areas throughout Europe, Latin America and the Caribbean including Italy, France, Venezuela, Mexico, and Puerto Rico, totaling fifty-two countries on six continents and twenty-nine islands. The first director was Wickliffe Rose, followed by F.F. Russell in 1923, Wilbur Sawyer in 1935, and George Strode in 1944. A number of notable physicians and field scientists worked on the international campaigns, including Lewis Hackett, Hideyo Noguchi, Juan Guiteras, George C. Payne, Livingston Farrand, Cornelius P. Rhoads, and William Bosworth Castle. The World Health Organization, seen as a successor to the IHD, was formed in 1948, and the IHD was subsumed by the larger Rockefeller Foundation in 1951, discontinuing its overseas work.

While the Rockefeller doctors working in tropical locales such as Mexico emphasized scientific neutrality, they had political and economic aims to promote the value of public health to improve American relations with the host country. Although they claimed the banner of public health and humanitarian medicine, they often engaged with politics and business interests. Rhoads was involved in a racism whitewashing scandal in the 1930s during which he joked about injecting cancer cells into Puerto Rican patients, inspiring Puerto Rican nationalist and anti-colonialist leader Pedro Albizu Campos. Noguchi was also involved in an unethical human experimentation scandal. Susan Lederer, Elizabeth Fee, and Jay Katz are among the modern scholars who have researched this period. Researchers with the foundation including Noguchi developed the vaccine to prevent yellow fever. Rhoads later became a significant cancer researcher and director of Memorial Sloan-Kettering, though his eponymous award for oncological excellence was renamed after the scandal reemerged.

During the late-1920s, the Rockefeller Foundation created the Medical Sciences Division, which emerged from the former Division of Medical Education. The division was led by Dr. Richard M. Pearce until his death in 1930, to which Alan Gregg succeeded him until 1945. During this period, the Division of Medical Sciences made contributions to research across several fields of psychiatry. In 1935 the foundation granted $100000 to the Institute for Psychoanalysis in Chicago. This grant was renewed in 1938, with payments extending into the early-1940s. This division funded women's contraception and the human reproductive system in general, but also was involved in funding controversial eugenics research. Other funding went into endocrinology departments in American universities, human heredity, mammalian biology, human physiology and anatomy, psychology, and the studies of human sexual behavior by Dr. Alfred Kinsey.

In the interwar years, the foundation funded public health, nursing, and social work in Eastern and Central Europe.

In 1950, the foundation expanded their international program of virus research, establishing field laboratories in Poona, India, Trinidad, Belém, Brazil, Johannesburg, South Africa, Cairo, Egypt, Ibadan, Nigeria, and Cali, Colombia, among others.  The foundation funded research into the identification of human viruses, techniques for virus identification, and arthropod-borne viruses.

Bristol-Myers Squibb, Johns Hopkins University and the Rockefeller Foundation are currently the subject of a $1 billion lawsuit from Guatemala for "roles in a 1940s U.S. government experiment that infected hundreds of Guatemalans with syphilis". A previous suit against the United States government was dismissed in 2011 for the Guatemala syphilis experiments when a judge determined that the U.S. government could not be held liable for actions committed outside of the U.S.

An experiment was conducted by Vanderbilt University in the 1940s where they gave 800 pregnant women radioactive iron, 751 of which were pills, without their consent. In a 1969 article published in the American Journal of Epidemiology, it was estimated that three children had died from the experiment.

Eugenics and World War II 

John D. Rockefeller Jr. was an outspoken supporter of eugenics. Even as late as 1951, John D. Rockefeller III and John Foster Dulles, who was chairman of the foundation at the time, established the Population Council to advance family planning, birth control, and population control, and goals of the eugenics movement.

The Rockefeller Foundation, along with the Carnegie Institution, was the primary financier for the Eugenics Record Office, until 1939. The foundation also provided grants to Margaret Sanger and Alexis Carrel, who supported birth control, compulsory sterilization and eugenics. Sanger went to Japan in 1922 and influenced the birth control movement there.

By 1926, Rockefeller had donated over $400,000, which would be almost $4 million adjusted for inflation in 2003, to hundreds of German researchers, including Ernst Rüdin and Otmar Freiherr von Verschuer, through funding the Kaiser Wilhelm Institute of Anthropology, Human Heredity, and Eugenics, (also known as the Max Planck Institute for Medical Research) which conducted eugenics experiments in Nazi Germany and influenced the development of Nazi racial scientific ideology. Rockefeller spent almost $3 million between 1925 and 1935, and also funded other German eugenicists, Herman Poll, Alfred Grotjahn, Eugen Fischer, and Hans Nachsteim, continuing even after Hitler's ascent to power in 1933; Rüdin's work influenced compulsory sterilisation in Nazi Germany. Josef Mengele worked as an assistant in Verschuer's lab, though Rockefeller executives did not know of Mengele and stopped funding that specific research before World War II started in 1939.

The Rockefeller Foundation continued funding German eugenics research even after it was clear that it was being used to rationalize discrimination against Jewish people and other groups, after the Nuremberg laws in 1935. In 1936, Rockefeller fulfilled pledges of $655,000 to Kaiser Wilhelm Institute, even though several distinguished Jewish scientists had been dropped from the institute at the time. The Rockefeller Foundation did not alert the world about the racist implications of Nazi ideology, but furthered and funded eugenic research through the 1930s. Even into the 1950s, Rockefeller continued to provide some funding for research borne out of German eugenics.

The foundation also funded the relocation of scholars threatened by the Nazis to America in the 1930s, known as the Refugee Scholar Program and the Emergency Committee in Aid of Displaced Foreign Scholars. Some of the notable figures relocated or saved, among a total of 303 scholars, were Thomas Mann, Claude Lévi-Strauss and Leó Szilárd. The foundation helped The New School provide a haven for scholars threatened by the Nazis.

After World War II the foundation sent a team to West Germany to investigate how it could become involved in reconstructing the country. They focused on restoring democracy, especially regarding education and scientific research, with the long-term goal of reintegrating Germany into the Western world.

The foundation also supported the early initiatives of Henry Kissinger, such as his directorship of Harvard's International Seminars (funded as well by the Central Intelligence Agency) and the early foreign policy magazine Confluence, both established by him while he was still a graduate student.

In 2021, Dr. Rajiv J. Shah, president of the Rockefeller Foundation, released a statement condemning eugenics and supporting the anti-eugenics movement. He stated that

"[...]we commend the Anti-Eugenics Project for their essential work to understand[...] the harmful legacies of eugenicist ideologies. [...] examine the role that philanthropies played in developing and perpetuating eugenics policies and practices. The Rockefeller Foundation is currently reckoning with our own history in relation to eugenics.  This requires uncovering the facts and confronting uncomfortable truths, [...] The Rockefeller Foundation is putting equity and inclusion at the center of all our work: [...] confronting the hateful legacies of the past [...] we understand that the work we engage in today does not absolve us of yesterday’s mistakes. [...]"

Development of the United Nations 
Although the United States never joined the League of Nations, the Rockefeller Foundation was involved, and by the 1930s the foundations had changed the League from a "Parliament of Nations" to a modern think tank that used specialized expertise to provide in-depth impartial analysis of international issues. After the war, the foundation was involved in the establishment of the United Nations.

Arts 

In the arts the Rockefeller Foundation has supported the Stratford Shakespeare Festival in Ontario, Canada, and the American Shakespeare Festival in Stratford, Connecticut, Arena Stage in Washington, D.C., Karamu House in Cleveland, and Lincoln Center in New York. The foundation underwrote of Spike Lee's documentary on New Orleans, When the Levees Broke. The film has been used as the basis for a curriculum on poverty, developed by the Teachers College at Columbia University for their students.

The foundation also owns and operates the Bellagio Center in Bellagio, Italy. The center has several buildings, spread across a  property, on the peninsula between lakes Como and Lecco in Northern Italy. The center is sometimes referred to as the Villa Serbelloni, the property bequeathed to the foundation in 1959 under the presidency of Dean Rusk (who was later to become U.S. President Kennedy's secretary of state). The Bellagio Center operates both a conference center and a residency program. Numerous Nobel laureates, Pulitzer winners, National Book Award recipients, Prince Mahidol Award winners and MacArthur fellows, as well as several acting and former heads of State and Government, have been in residence at Bellagio.

The Cultural Innovation Fund is a pilot grant program that is overseen by Lincoln Center. The grants are to be used towards art and cultural opportunities in the underserved areas of Brooklyn and the South Bronx with three overarching goals.

The Rockefeller Foundation supported the art scene in Haiti in 1948 and a literacy project with UNESCO.

Rusk was involved with funding the humanities and the social sciences during the Cold War period, including study of the Soviet Union.

In July 2022, the Rockefeller Foundation granted $1m to the Wikimedia Foundation.

Agriculture

Agriculture was introduced to the Natural Sciences division of the foundation in the major reorganization of 1928. In 1941, the foundation gave a small grant to Mexico for maize research, in collaboration with the then new president, Manuel Ávila Camacho. This was done after the intervention of vice-president Henry Wallace and the involvement of Nelson Rockefeller; the primary intention being to stabilise the Mexican Government and derail any possible communist infiltration, in order to protect the Rockefeller family's investments.

By 1943, this program, under the foundation's Mexican Agriculture Project, had proved such a success with the science of corn propagation and general principles of agronomy that it was exported to other Latin American countries; in 1956, the program was then taken to India; again with the geopolitical imperative of providing an antidote to communism. It wasn't until 1959 that senior foundation officials succeeded in getting the Ford Foundation (and later USAID, and later still, the World Bank) to sign on to the major philanthropic project, known now to the world as the Green Revolution. It was originally conceived in 1943 as CIMMYT, the International Maize and Wheat Improvement Center in Mexico. It also provided significant funding for the International Rice Research Institute in the Philippines. Part of the original program, the funding of the IRRI was later taken over by the Ford Foundation. The International Rice Research Institute and the International Maize and Wheat Improvement Center are part of a consortium of agricultural research organizations known as CGIAR.

Costing around $600 million, over 50 years, the revolution brought new farming technology, increased productivity, expanded crop yields and mass fertilization to many countries throughout the world. Later it funded over $100 million of plant biotechnology research and trained over four hundred scientists from Asia, Africa and Latin America. It also invested in the production of transgenic crops, including rice and maize. In 1999, the then president Gordon Conway addressed the Monsanto Company board of directors, warning of the possible social and environmental dangers of this biotechnology, and requesting them to disavow the use of so-called terminator genes; the company later complied.

In the 1990s, the foundation shifted its agriculture work and emphasis to Africa; in 2006, it joined with the Bill & Melinda Gates Foundation in a $150 million effort to fight hunger in the continent through improved agricultural productivity. In an interview marking the 100 year anniversary of the Rockefeller Foundation, Judith Rodin explained to This Is Africa that Rockefeller has been involved in Africa since their beginning in three main areas – health, agriculture and education, though agriculture has been and continues to be their largest investment in Africa.

Urban development

A total of 100 cities across six continents were part of the 100 Resilient Cities program funded by the Rockefeller Foundation. In January 2016, the United States Department of Housing and Urban Development announced winners of its National Disaster Resilience Competition (NDRC), awarding three 100RC member cities – New York, NY; Norfolk, VA; and New Orleans, LA – with more than $437 million in disaster resilience funding. The grant was the largest ever received by the city of Norfolk.

In April 2019, it was announced that the foundation would no longer be funding the 100 Resilient Cities program as a whole. Some elements of the initiative's work, most prominently the funding of several cities' Chief Resilience Officer roles, continues to be managed and funded by the Rockefeller Foundation, while other aspects of the program continue in the form of two independent organizations, Resilient Cities Catalyst (RCC) and the Global Resilient Cities Network (GRCN), founded by former 100RC leadership and staff.

People affiliated with the foundation

Board members and trustees
On January 5, 2017, the board of trustees announced the selection of Dr. Rajiv Shah to serve as the 13th president of the foundation. Shah became the youngest person, at 43, and first Indian-American to serve as president of the foundation. He assumed the position March 1, succeeding Judith Rodin who served as president for nearly twelve years and announced her retirement, at age 71, in June 2016. A former president of the University of Pennsylvania, Rodin was the first woman to head the foundation. Rodin in turn had succeeded Gordon Conway in 2005. Current staff as of June 1, 2021 include:

 Admiral James G. Stavridis (chair), 2018-, retired United States Navy; Supreme Allied Commander at NATO, 2009–2013, Operating Executive, The Carlyle Group; chair of the Board of Counselors, McLarty Associates
 Agnes Binagwaho, 2019-, Vice-Chancellor, The University of Global Health Equity, Rwanda
 Mellody Hobson, 2018-, President, Ariel Investments
 Donald Kaberuka, 2015-, former president, African Development Bank Group, Rwanda Minister of Finance and Economic Planning between 1997 and 2005.
 Martin L. Leibowitz, 2012-, Vice-chairman, Morgan Stanley Research Department's Global Strategy Team; formerly TIAA-CREF (1995 to 2004) and 26 years with Salomon Brothers
 Yifei Li, 2013-, country chair, Man Group China
 Ndidi Okonkwo Nwuneli, 2019-, co-founder, Sahel Consulting
 Paul Polman, 2019-, chair, International Chamber of Commerce, The B Team; Former CEO, Unilever
 Sharon Percy Rockefeller, 2017-, President & CEO, WETA-TV
 Juan Manuel Santos, 2020-, Former President of Colombia & Recipient of 2016 Nobel Peace Prize
 Dr. Rajiv Shah, 2017-, President of the foundation and ex-officio member of the board; served as a Rockefeller Foundation Trustee, 2015–2017; former administrator of the United States Agency for International Development (USAID) from 2010 to 2017.
 Adam Silver, 2020-, Commissioner, National Basketball Association (NB)
 Patty Stonesifer, 2019-, former President & CEO, Martha's Table; former CEO and co-chair, Bill and Melinda Gates Foundation
 Ravi Venkatesan, 2014-, former chairman, Bank of Baroda; former Chairman Microsoft India (2004–2011) and Cummins India; Special Representative for Young People and Innovation, UNICEF

Past trustees

 Alan Alda, 1989–1994 – actor and film director.
 Winthrop W. Aldrich 1935–1951 – chairman of the Chase National Bank, 1934–1953; Ambassador to the Court of St. James, 1953–1957.
 John W. Davis 1922–1939 – J. P. Morgan's private attorney; founding president of the Council on Foreign Relations.
 C. Douglas Dillon 1960–1961 – US Treasury Secretary, 1961–1965; member of the Council on Foreign Relations.
 Orvil E. Dryfoos 1960–1963 – publisher of The New York Times, 1961–1963.
 Peggy Dulany, 1989–1994 – Fourth child of David Rockefeller; founder and president of Synergos.
 John Foster Dulles 1935–1952 (chairman) – US Secretary of State, 1953–1959; senior partner, Sullivan & Cromwell law firm.
 Charles William Eliot 1914–1917 – president of Harvard, 1869–1909.
 John Robert Evans 1982 -1996 (chairman) – president of the University of Toronto 1972–1978; founding director of the Population, Health and Nutrition Department of the World Bank
 Ann M. Fudge, 2006–2015, former chairman and CEO, Young & Rubicam Brands, New York
 Frederick Taylor Gates 1913–1923 – John D. Rockefeller Sr.'s principal advisor.
 Helene D. Gayle, 2010–2019, president and CEO of CARE.
 Stephen Jay Gould 1993–2002 – author; professor and curator, Museum of Comparative Zoology, Harvard University.
 Rajat Gupta, 2006–11, former director, Goldman Sachs, Procter & Gamble, AMR Corporation; Special Advisor to the UN Secretary-General; former managing director, McKinsey & Company.
 Wallace Harrison 1951–1961 – Rockefeller family architect; lead architect for the UN Headquarters complex.
 Thomas J. Healey, 2003–2012, partner, Healey Development LLC; teaching course at Harvard University's John F. Kennedy School of Government; formerly with Goldman Sachs and an Assistant Secretary of the U.S. Treasury.
 Alice S. Huang, senior faculty associate, California Institute of Technology.
 Charles Evans Hughes 1917–1921; 1925–1928 – Chief Justice of the United States, 1930–1941.
 Robert A. Lovett 1949–1961 – US Secretary of Defense, 1951–1953.
 Monica Lozano, 2012–2018, CEO, ImpreMedia, LLC
 Yo-Yo Ma 1999–2002 – cellist.
 Strive Masiyiwa, 2003–2018, Zimbabwe a businessman and cellphone pioneer, founding Econet Wireless.
 Jessica T. Mathews, president, Carnegie Endowment for International Peace, Washington, D.C.
 John J. McCloy chairman: 1946–1949; 1953–1958 – prominent US presidential advisor; chairman of the Ford Foundation, 1958–1965; chairman of the council on Foreign Relations.
 Bill Moyers 1969–1981 – journalist.
 Diana Natalicio, 2004–2014, president, The University of Texas at El Paso
 Ngozi Okonjo-Iweala, 2009–2018, Finance Minister of Nigeria; former managing director of the World Bank; former Foreign Minister of Nigeria.
 Sandra Day O'Connor, 2006–2013, associate justice, retired, Supreme Court of the United States
 James F. Orr, III, (board chair), president and chief executive officer, LandingPoint Capital, Boston, Massachusetts.
 Richard Parsons, 2007–2021, chairman of the board, Citigroup Inc.
 Surin Pitsuwan, 2010–2012, secretary general of ASEAN (2007–2012) and Thai politician.
 Mamphela Ramphele, chairperson, Circle Capital Ventures, Cape Town, South Africa.
 David Rockefeller Jr., 2006–2016, chair of foundation board Dec. 2010- ; vice-chairman of Rockefeller Family & Associates; director and former chair, Rockefeller & Co., Inc.; current trustee of the Museum of Modern Art.
 John D. Rockefeller 1913–1923.
 John D. Rockefeller Jr. chairman: 1917–1939.
 John D. Rockefeller III chairman: 1952–1972.
 John D. Rockefeller IV 1976–81.
 Judith Rodin, president of the foundation (2005-2016); ex-officio member of the board
 Julius Rosenwald 1917–1931 – chairman of Sears Roebuck, 1932–1939.
 John Rowe M.D., 2007–2019, professor at the Columbia University Mailman School of Public Health; former chairman and CEO of Aetna Inc.
 Dean Rusk 1950–1961 – US Secretary of State, 1961–1969.
 Raymond W. Smith, chairman, Rothschild, Inc., New York; chairman of Arlington Capital Partners; chairman of Verizon Ventures; and a trustee of the Carnegie Corporation of New York.
 Frank Stanton 1961–1966? – president of CBS, 1946–1971.
 Arthur Hays Sulzberger 1939–1957 – publisher of The New York Times, 1935–1961.
 Paul Volcker 1975–1979 – chairman, board of governors, Federal Reserve Board; president, New York Federal Reserve Bank.
 Thomas J. Watson Jr. 1963–1970? – president of IBM, 1952–1971.
 James Wolfensohn – former president of the World Bank.
 George D. Woods 1961–1967? – president of the World Bank, 1963–1968.
 Võ Tòng Xuân, 2002–2010, vice president for academic affairs, Tan Tao University, Ho Chi Minh City; former rector of An Giang University, the second university in Vietnam's Mekong Delta.
 Owen D. Young 1928–1939 – chairman of GE, 1922–1939, 1942–1945.

Presidents

 John D. Rockefeller Jr. – 11 February 1913 – 6 November 1917
 George E. Vincent – 6 November 1917 – 20 September 1929; member of the John D. Rockefeller/Frederick T. Gates General Education Board (1914–1929)
 Max Mason – 20 September 1929 – 30 May 1936
 Raymond B. Fosdick – 30 May 1936 – 22 August 1948; brother of American clergyman Harry Emerson Fosdick
 Chester Barnard – 22 August 1948 – 17 July 1952; Bell System executive and author of landmark 1938 book, The Functions of the Executive
 Dean Rusk – 17 July 1952 – 19 January 1961; United States Secretary of State from 1961 to 1969
 J. George Harrar – 20 January 1961 – 3 October 1972; plant pathologist, "generally regarded as the father of 'the Green Revolution.'"
 John Hilton Knowles – 3 October 1972 – 31 December 1979; physician, general director of the Massachusetts General Hospital (1962–1971).
 Richard Lyman – 1 January 1980 – 11 January 1988; president of Stanford University (1970–1980).
 Peter Goldmark Jr. – 11 January 1988 – 31 December 1997; former executive director of the Port Authority of New York and New Jersey.
 Gordon Conway – 1 January 1998 – 31 December 2004; an agricultural ecologist and former president of the Royal Geographical Society.
 Judith Rodin - 1 January 2005 – 1 March 2017; former president of the University of Pennsylvania, and provost, chair of the Department of Psychology, Yale University.
 Rajiv Shah - 1 March 2017 -, distinguished fellow in residence, Georgetown University; previously administrator of the United States Agency for International Development (USAID) from 2010 to 2015.

Organizations that received Rockefeller grants 

 Rockefeller University
 Council on Foreign Relations (CFR) – Especially the notable 1939-45 War and Peace Studies that advised the US State Department and the US government on World War II strategy and forward planning
 Royal Institute of International Affairs (RIIA) in London
 Carnegie Endowment for International Peace in Washington – Support of the diplomatic training program
 Brookings Institution in Washington – Significant funding of research grants in the fields of economic and social studies
 World Bank in Washington – Helped finance the training of foreign officials through the Economic Development Institute
 Harvard University – Grants to the Center for International Affairs and medical, business and administration Schools
 Yale University – Substantial funding to the Institute of International Studies
 Princeton University – Office of Population Research
 Columbia University – Establishment of the Russia Institute
 University of the Philippines, Los Baños – Funded research for the College of Agriculture and built an international house for foreign students
 McGill University – The Rockefeller Foundation funded the Montreal Neurological Institute, on the request of Dr. Wilder Penfield, a Canadian neurosurgeon, who had met David Rockefeller years before
 Library of Congress – Funded a project for photographic copies of the complete card catalogues for the world's fifty leading libraries
 Bodleian Library at Oxford University – Grant for a building to house five million volumes
 Population Council of New York – Funded fellowships
 Social Science Research Council – Major funding for fellowships and grants-in-aid
 National Bureau of Economic Research
 National Institute of Public Health of Japan (formerly ja) in Tokyo (1938)
 Group of Thirty – In 1978 the foundation invited Geoffrey Bell to set up this high-powered and influential advisory group on global financial issues, whose former chairman was longtime Rockefeller associate Paul Volcker, until his death in 2019
 London School of Economics – funded research and general budget
 University of Lyon, France – funded research in natural sciences, social sciences, medicine and the new building of the medical school during the 1920s-1930s
 The Trinidad Regional Virus Laboratory
 The Results for Development Institute – funded the Center for Health Market Innovations
 Mahidol University in Thailand
 VoteRiders - a nationwide nonprofit founded in 2012 to promote a resilient democracy through voter ID access

See also

 Asia Society
 Association Internationale Africaine
 CGIAR
 Eugenics in the United States
 Industrial relations
 Philanthropy
 Philanthropy in the United States
 Rockefeller Brothers Fund
 Rockefeller family
 Social sciences

References

Further reading
 
 
 Birn, Anne-Emanuelle. "Philanthrocapitalism, past and present: The Rockefeller Foundation, the Gates Foundation, and the setting (s) of the international/global health agenda." Hypothesis 12.1 (2014): e8. online
 Birn, Anne-Emanuelle, and Elizabeth Fee. "The Rockefeller Foundation and the international health agenda"], The Lancet, (2013) Volume 381, Issue 9878, Pages 1618 - 1619, online
 Brown, E. Richard, Rockefeller Medicine Men: Medicine and Capitalism in America, Berkeley: University of California Press, 1979.
 Chernow, Ron, Titan: The Life of John D. Rockefeller Sr., London: Warner Books, 1998. online
 Cotton, James. "Rockefeller, Carnegie, and the limits of American hegemony in the emergence of Australian international studies." International Relations of the Asia-Pacific 12.1 (2012): 161–192. [
 Dowie, Mark, American Foundations: An Investigative History, Boston: The MIT Press, 2001.
 Eckl, Julian. "The power of private foundations: Rockefeller and Gates in the struggle against malaria." Global Social Policy 14.1 (2014): 91–116.
 Erdem, Murat, and W. ROSE Kenneth. "American Philanthropy ın Republican Turkey; The Rockefeller and Ford Foundations." The Turkish Yearbook of International Relations 31 (2000): 131–157. online
 Farley, John. To cast out disease: a history of the International Health Division of Rockefeller Foundation (1913-1951) (Oxford University Press, 2004).
 Fisher, Donald, Fundamental Development of the Social Sciences: Rockefeller Philanthropy and the United States Social Science Research Council, Michigan: University of Michigan Press, 1993.
 Fosdick, Raymond B., John D. Rockefeller Jr., A Portrait, New York: Harper & Brothers, 1956.
 Fosdick, Raymond B., The Story of the Rockefeller Foundation (1952) online
 Hauptmann, Emily. "From opposition to accommodation: How Rockefeller Foundation grants redefined relations between political theory and social science in the 1950s." American Political Science Review 100.4 (2006): 643–649. online
 Jonas, Gerald.  The Circuit Riders: Rockefeller Money and the Rise of Modern Science. New York: W.W. Norton and Co., 1989. online
 Kay, Lily, The Molecular Vision of Life: Caltech, the Rockefeller Foundation, and the Rise of the New Biology, New York: Oxford University Press, 1993.
 Laurence, Peter L. "The death and life of urban design: Jane Jacobs, The Rockefeller Foundation and the new research in urbanism, 1955–1965." Journal of Urban Design 11.2 (2006): 145–172. online
 Lawrence, Christopher. Rockefeller Money, the Laboratory and Medicine in Edinburgh 1919–1930: New Science in an Old Country, Rochester Studies in Medical History, University of Rochester Press, 2005.
 Mathers, Kathryn Frances. Shared journey: The Rockefeller Foundation, human capital, and development in Africa (2013) online
 Nielsen, Waldemar, The Big Foundations, New York: Cambridge University Press, 1973. online
 Nielsen, Waldemar A., The Golden Donors, E. P. Dutton, 1985. Called Foundation "unimaginative ... lacking leadership....slouching toward senility." online
 Ninkovich, Frank. "The Rockefeller Foundation, China, and Cultural Change." Journal of American History 70.4 (1984): 799–820. online
 Palmer, Steven, Launching Global Health: The Caribbean Odyssey of the Rockefeller Foundation, Ann Arbor: University of Michigan Press, 2010.
 Perkins, John H. "The Rockefeller Foundation and the green revolution, 1941–1956." Agriculture and Human Values 7.3 (1990): 6–18. online
 Sachse, Carola. What Research, to What End? The Rockefeller Foundation and the Max Planck Gesellschaft in the Early Cold War (2009) online
 Shaplen, Robert, Toward the Well-Being of Mankind: Fifty Years of the Rockefeller Foundation, New York: Doubleday & Company, Inc., 1964.
 
 Theiler, Max and Downs, W. G., The Arthropod-Borne Viruses of Vertebrates: An Account of The Rockefeller Foundation Virus Program, 1951–1970. (1973) Yale University Press. New Haven and London. .
 Uy, Michael Sy. Ask the Experts: How Ford, Rockefeller, and the NEA Changed American Music, (Oxford University Press, 2020) 270pp.
  Wood, Andrew Grant. "Sanitizing the State: The Rockefeller International Health Board and the Yellow Fever Campaign in Veracruz."  Americas 6#1 Spring 2010 ·
 Youde, Jeremy. "The Rockefeller and Gates Foundations in global health governance." Global Society 27.2 (2013): 139–158. online

 Rockefeller Foundation 990
 100 Years: The International Health Board. The Rockefeller Foundation/Rockefeller Archive Center.

External links

 
 CFR Website – Continuing the Inquiry: The Council on Foreign Relations from 1921 to 1996  The history of the council by Peter Grose, a council member – mentions financial support from the Rockefeller foundation.
 Foundation Center: Top 50 US Foundations by total giving
 New York Times: Rockefeller Foundation Elects 5 – Including Alan Alda and Peggy Dulany
 SFGate.com: "Eugenics and the Nazis: the California Connection"
 Press for Conversion! magazine, Issue # 53: "Facing the Corporate Roots of American Fascism," Bryan Sanders, Coalition to Oppose the Arms Trade, March 2004
Rockefeller Foundation website, including a timeline
 Hookworm and malaria research in Malaya, Java, and the Fiji Islands; report of Uncinariasis commission to the Orient, 1915–1917 The Rockefeller foundation, International health board. New York 1920

 

 
Rockefeller family
Institutions founded by the Rockefeller family
1913 establishments in New York (state)
Eugenics organizations